Arcidens wheeleri is a species of freshwater mussels in the family Unionidae, the river mussels. Its common names are the Ouachita rock pocketbook and Wheeler's pearly mussel. The former monotypic genus of Arkansia was named for the state of Arkansas, where the mussel was first discovered.

This is a federally listed endangered species of the United States.

Distribution
This species is native to Arkansas, Oklahoma, and Texas in the United States, which have only four or five small, isolated populations. Of the remaining populations, only the one located in the Kiamichi River in Oklahoma is viable.

Description
This mussel is not sexually dimorphic; the sexes appear the same. The shell is brown or black, lustrous and iridescent. The nacre is part pink and part white or bluish.

References

Natural history of Arkansas
Natural history of Texas
Natural history of Oklahoma
Unionidae
Taxonomy articles created by Polbot
Taxa named by Arnold Edward Ortmann
ESA endangered species